Adelchi Pelaschier (24 October 1921 – 28 June 1993) was an Italian sailor. He competed at the 1952 Summer Olympics and the 1956 Summer Olympics.

References

External links
 

1921 births
1993 deaths
Italian male sailors (sport)
Olympic sailors of Italy
Sailors at the 1952 Summer Olympics – Finn
Sailors at the 1956 Summer Olympics – Finn
People from Monfalcone
Sportspeople from Friuli-Venezia Giulia